Trust is the eighth studio album by Alfie Boe. It was released on 11 November 2013 in the United Kingdom by Decca Records. The album peaked at number 8 on the UK Albums Chart.

Track listing

Credits

Musicians
 Jack Ashford - Tambourine
 Burt Bacharach - Composer
 Jay Bellerose - Drums, Percussion
 Alfie Boe - Arranger, Primary Artist, Vocals (Background)
 Jacques Brel - Composer
 Andy Butler - Double Bass
 Jorge Calderón - Composer
 Hoagy Carmichael - Composer
 Jimmy Cliff - Composer
 Shawn Colvin - Featured Artist
 Elvis Costello - Composer
 Michelle Djokic - Cello
 Bob Dylan - Composer
 Nina Flyer - Cello
 Connie Gantsweg - Violin
 Stuart Gorrell - Composer
 Gary Grant - Trumpet
 Candace Guirao - Violin
 Larry Hall - Trumpet
 Dawn Harms - Violin
 Patricia Heller - Viola
 Jerry Hey - Horn Arrangements
 Russ Hicks - Pedal Steel Guitar
 Dan Higgins - Saxophone
 Steve Hoffman - Trombone
 Clydene Jackson - Vocals (Background)
 Booker T. Jones - Organ
 Jan Ketchum - String Contractor
 Julie Kim - Violin
 Mia Kim - Violin
 Carole King - Composer
 Polly Malan - Viola
 Roy Malan - Violin
 Robin Mayforth - Violin
 Patrick McCarthy - Double Bass
 Charlie McCoy - Harmonica, Vibraphone
 Steve McEwan - Composer
 Rod McKuen - Composer
 Vince Mendoza - String Arrangements
 Emil Miland - Cello
 Emily Oderdonk - Viola
 Dean Parks - Guitar (Electric)
 Deborah Price - Violin
 Evan Price - Violin
 Barbara Riccardi - Violin
 Matt Rollings - Piano
 Wenyl Shih - Violin
 Leland Sklar - Guitar (Bass)
 Chris Stapleton - Composer
 Eric Sung - Cello
 Fred Tackett - Cuatro, Guitar, Mandolin
 Richard Thompson - Composer
 Meg Titchener - Viola
 Igor Veligan - Violin
 Natalia Vershilova - Viola
 Mark Volkert - Violin
 Vivian Warkentin - Violin
 Julia Tillman Waters - Vocals (Background)
 Maxine Waters - Vocals (Background)
 Gabe Witcher - Fiddle
 Ogura Yasushi - Violin
 Warren Zevon - Composer

Production
 Lorenzo Agius - Photography
 Mellissa Bradbury - Assistant Management
 Sarah Brunton - Product Manager
 Paul Chessell - Design
 CJ Eiriksson - Vocal Engineer
 Jill Ferris - Management
 Neil Ferris - Management
 Robert Gatley - Engineer
 Bernie Grundman - Mastering Engineer
 Karyn Hughes - A&R
 Andrea Johnson - Booking
 Leslie Ann Jones - String Engineer
 Nigel Jones - Legal Advisor
 Travis Kennedy - Mixing Assistant
 Chris Kershaw - Product Manager
 Heulwen Keyte - Booking
 Larry Klein - Arranger, Producer
 Tom Lewis - A&R
 Lennie Moore - Copyist
 Tim Palmer - Mixing
 Vanessa Parr - Assistant Engineer
 Sandy Robertson - Management, Production Coordination
 Rod Shearer - Engineer
 Vick Shuttleworth - Accounting
 Mike Wilson - Engineer

Chart performance

Weekly charts

Year-end charts

Certifications

Release history

References

2013 albums
Alfie Boe albums